Elixer is an unincorporated community in Dallas County, in the U.S. state of Missouri.

History
A post office called Elixer was established in 1882, and remained in operation until 1906. The community took its name from nearby Elixir Spring.

References

Unincorporated communities in Dallas County, Missouri
Unincorporated communities in Missouri